Eli Tomac (born November 14, 1992) is an American professional Motocross and Supercross racer competing in the AMA Supercross and Motocross championships; a two-time AMA Supercross Champion (2020 & 2022), a five-time AMA Pro Motocross Champion and a Regional 250 Supercross Champion.

As an amateur Tomac won eight Loretta Lynn’s Amateur Championship titles.
He didn't win titles right away or through his first five years (from 1999 through 2003). His first title came in 2004. Tomac's amateur titles are as follows:
 2004 65cc(10-11) Stock,
 2006 85cc(12-13) Modified,
 2007 85cc(14-15) Modified,
 2007 Supermini(12-15),
 2008 Supermini 1(12-15),
 2008 Supermini 2(14-16),
 2009 250B Modified,
 2009 Schoolboy 2(14-16).

Tomac began his professional career in 2010, winning his first race in his rookie debut. He made his 450cc debut part way into the 2013 Supercross schedule, and moved to the class full-time in 2014.

He won his first outdoor 450cc event at the 2014 Spring Creek National in Millville, Minnesota, US. His first 450cc Supercross win came in 2015 at Chase Field in Phoenix, Arizona.

Tomac was part of the Kawasaki factory racing team since the 2016 season. He joined Monster Energy Yamaha Star Racing for the 2022 season.

In 2022 Tomac won a record setting sixth Daytona Supercross passing previous record holder Ricky Carmichael with five.  In 2023 Eli won his 7th Daytona Supercross.

Tomac is currently third in all-time 450cc Motocross wins with 32.

He is currently third all-time in 450 Supercross wins with 49.

3rd All-Time in 450 Supercross and National Motocross (Combined 450 & 250 Class) Wins at 93.  Only Ricky Carmichael (150 Wins), James Stewart Jr. (98 Wins) have more.

Personal life
Tomac is the younger of two sons of former competitive BMX, road cycling and mountain bike racing champion John Tomac and wife Kathy.

Eli is married to Jessica (Steiner) Tomac and together they have 2 children: daughter, Lev Loe and son, Noah Grey

250cc career
In 2010, Eli Tomac became the first rider in the history of the sport to win his professional debut, winning the 250cc AMA 2010 Hangtown Motocross season opener in Rancho Cordova, California. At that time he was riding for Team Geico Honda.

For 2011, Eli ended the 250cc Supercross season with two wins and six podium finishes. Finishing 2nd To Broc Tickle by 6 points in the 250SX West Championship.

For 2012, Eli won the 250cc Supercross championship with seven podium finishes and five first place main event wins.

For 2013, Eli finishes 2 points behind Ken Roczen in the 250cc Supercross championship with five first place main event wins. He won the AMA Motocross 250cc title with 7 overall wins and 12 out of 12 podium finishes.

2015 season
Despite injuries in 2014 & 2015, Eli finished second to Ryan Dungey in the 450cc Supercross championship with eleven podium finishes. He started the outdoor motocross season with two overall wins, two overall podiums with five straight moto wins before being sidelined by an injury.

2017 season

After six rounds of the 2017 Monster Energy AMA Supercross season, Eli was in fourth place in the 450 class overall point standings. His mixed results (5th, 6th, 8th, 1st, 1st, 15th) put him 29 points behind supercross points leader Ryan Dungey. Following round 6, Tomac won 6 of the next 8 races and was tied for 1st place in the point standings with Dungey. At round 15 in Salt Lake City, UT, Tomac put forth a dominating effort to win his 9th supercross main event in 2017. Going into the penultimate round of Monster Energy AMA Supercross in East Rutherford, NJ, Tomac held a 3-point lead over Dungey. However, in the main event, a series of mistakes led him to finish in 8th place. Ryan Dungey would go on to win the race and take an eight point advantage over Tomac with one round remaining. At the final round of Monster Energy AMA Supercross in Las Vegas, NV, Tomac finished 2nd and Dungey placed 4th. Eli was unable to close the points gap, coming up 5 points short of the 2017 Monster Energy AMA Supercross championship.

Tomac began the 2017 AMA Motocross Championship season with 5 consecutive moto wins and 5 consecutive overall wins. Throughout the series, Tomac only finished off of the podium at two of the 12 rounds. He would go on to win the 2017 motocross title scoring a total of 470 points.  Marvin Musquin finished second with 453 points and Blake Baggett finished third overall with 451 points.

2022 Supercross Season

At the 16th round of the 2022 AMA Supercross Championship in Denver, Eli clinched the 450cc title over runner-up, Jason Anderson. Although he got 5th, he only needed to secure a 14th or better to win the championship at his hometown race. This is now his 2nd 450cc title in Supercross, and his first ever year on the Monster Energy/ Star Racing Yamaha. He was subsequently awarded the Best Male Action Sports Athlete ESPY Award at the 2022 ESPY Awards.

Motocross of Nations participation

Eli has participated as parts of Team U.S.A in the Motocross des Nations on four occasions.

In 2013 fresh off of his Outdoor Motocross 250cc title he was chosen for the MX2 position.  The race was held in Teutschenthal, Germany.  A crash in the first Moto relegated him to 16th.  In Moto 2 Eli finished 2nd after a race long battle with Ken Roczen.  Team U.S.A. placed 2nd overall.
 
In 2014 Eli was chosen to fill the Open Class position.  The race was held in Kegums, Latvia.  He struggle to a 6th place finish in his first Moto.  After crashing with other riders at the start of the 2nd Moto, Eli put on a charge racing all the way up to a 3rd place finish.  Team U.S.A placed 3rd overall.

In 2018, after winning the 450cc AMA Motocross title, Eli accepted the team captain position in the MXGP class.  The race was held at Red Bud MX in Buchanan, MI.  Eli raced to a 4th place in Moto 1 on a rain soaked, muddy track.  In Moto 2 Eli crashed but was able to race from the back of the pack to a 7th place finish.  Team U.S.A placed 5th overall.

In 2022, after winning the both the 450cc AMA Supercross and AMA Motocross titles, Eli accepted the team captain position in the MXGP class once again.  The race as in 2018 was also held at Red Bud MX in Buchanan, MI and started out with a déjà vu feel as it had rained heavily the night before leaving the track soaked and muddy.  Eli (racing with number 101) set the tone for Team USA by racing to an overall Win in Moto 1 with his MX2 teammate Justin Cooper (motorcyclist) taking a 9th.  Chase Sexton finished 2nd in Moto 2 with Justin Cooper scoring a 4th place leaving Team USA in the drivers seat for the overall win.  In Moto 3 Eli started 10th but advised through his pit boards that Chase was in 3rd and it wasn’t needed for him to race with urgency as they had enough points to win.  He finished in 6th place and Team U.S.A took the overall win for the first time in 11 years.

AMA Supercross/Motocross results

Notes: 1) The AMA Motocross Season (MX) is 12 rounds, The AMA Supercross Season (SX) is 17 Rounds. *Missed Rounds 1,2,3,4,10,11,12 & 17 of 2014 450 SX Due to injuries. †Missed the first 4 Nationals of 2014 due to injury. ‡Missed the remaining Nationals after Round 3 of the 2015 MX Series due to injury. §The 2020 MX season was shortened to 9 Rounds. ¶The 2nd round of the 2023 SX (SMX) series (Oakland, CA) was rescheduled to take place after the 6th round due to flooding; but is still classified as the 2nd round.

References

External links
 Eli Tomac profile

1992 births
Living people
People from Cortez, Colorado
American motocross riders
AMA Motocross Championship National Champions